"8 Days of Christmas" is a song recorded by American girl group Destiny's Child for their Christmas album of the same title (2001). Written by group members Beyoncé and Kelly Rowland along with Errol McCalla, Jr., who handled its production, it is a Christmas-themed song with heavy R&B and dance pop elements.

The song was first released in November 2000 on the reissue of the group's second studio album The Writing's on the Wall (1999) and the US maxi CD single for their song "Independent Women Part I" (2000), before being released as the lead single from 8 Days of Christmas on December 16, 2001, by Columbia Records.

Writing and production
"8 Days of Christmas" is based on "The Twelve Days of Christmas". Knowles stated during its video premiere at 106 & Park in 2001: "Actually, we wrote the song two years ago, when we went in the studio to do some Christmas something. That's what started the idea of doing a Christmas album."

Music video
The accompanying music video for "8 Days of Christmas" was directed by Sanaa Hamri. It shows all three members appearing in Santa Claus-inspired clothing at a toy store on a snowy day. Throughout the video, the group shops for various gifts and in between cuts and Knowles rides on a carousel. At the end of the video, many children rush into the toy store where the group gives out gifts.

The music video is featured on the DualDisc edition of 8 Days of Christmas.

Track listings and formats
"Independent Women" US CD maxi-single
"Independent Women" (Part 1 – Album Version) – 3:41
"Independent Women" (Victor Calderone Drum Dub Mix) – 5:30
"Independent Women" (Victor Calderone Club Mix) – 9:36
"Independent Women" (Maurice's Independent Man Remix) – 7:30
"8 Days of Christmas" – 3:29

CD single
"8 Days of Christmas" (Album Version) – 3:29
"Emotion" (Album Version) – 3:56

US CD promo
"8 Days of Christmas" (LP Version) – 3:29
"8 Days of Christmas" (Instrumental) – 3:29
"8 Days of Christmas" (A Cappella) – 3:29

Brazil CD promo
"8 Days of Christmas" (Album Version)
"8 Days of Christmas" (Radio Edit)
"8 Days of Christmas" (BCDj's Holiday Mix)

European CD single
"8 Days of Christmas" (Album Version) – 3:29
"Emotion" (Album Version) – 3:56

Charts

Certifications

References

American Christmas songs
Destiny's Child songs
Music videos directed by Sanaa Hamri
Songs written by Beyoncé
2001 singles
Songs written by Kelly Rowland
2000 songs
Columbia Records singles
Song recordings produced by Beyoncé